Stratus clouds are low-level clouds characterized by horizontal layering with a uniform base, as opposed to convective or cumuliform clouds that are formed by rising thermals. More specifically, the term stratus is used to describe flat, hazy, featureless clouds at low altitudes varying in color from dark gray to nearly white. The word stratus comes from the Latin prefix strato-, meaning "layer". Stratus clouds may produce a light drizzle or a small amount of snow. These clouds are essentially above-ground fog formed either through the lifting of morning fog or through cold air moving at low altitudes over a region. Some call these clouds "high fog" for their fog-like form. While light rain may fall, this cloud does not indicate much meteorological precipitation.

Formation 
Stratus clouds form when weak vertical currents lift a layer of air off the ground and it depressurizes, following the lapse rate. This causes the relative humidity to increase due to the adiabatic cooling. This occurs in environments where atmospheric stability is abundant.

Description 
Stratus clouds look like featureless gray to white sheets of cloud. They can be composed of water droplets, supercooled water droplets, or ice crystals depending upon the ambient temperature.

Subforms

Species 

Stratus nebulosus clouds appear as a featureless or nebulous veil or layer of stratus clouds with no distinctive features or structure. They are found at low altitudes, and are a good sign of atmospheric stability, which indicates continuous stable weather. Stratus nebulosus may produce light rain and drizzle or flakes of snow. Stratus fractus clouds on the other hand, appear with an irregular shape, and forms with a clearly fragmented or ragged appearance. They mostly appear under the precipitation of major rain-bearing clouds; these are nimbostratus and cumulonimbus clouds, and are classified as pannus clouds. Stratus fractus can also form beside mountain slopes, without the presence of nimbus clouds (clouds that precipitate), and their color can be from dark grey to almost white.

Opacity-based varieties 
Stratus fractus are not divided into varieties, but stratus nebulosus on the other hand, are divided into two. The Stratus opacus variety appears as a nebulous or milky sheet of the nebulosus species, but are opaque enough to block the sun from view. Stratus Translucidus is another variety of the nebulosus species. These clouds are considered more thin than the opacus variety because this cloud is rather translucent, allowing the position of the sun or moon to be observed from earth's surface.

Pattern-based variety 
Stratus clouds only have one pattern-based variety. This is the stratus undulatus variety. Mild undulations can be observed from this cloud, only associated by the nebulosus species. Though rare, this cloud formation is caused by disturbances on the gentle wind shear. Stratus undulatus clouds are more common on stratus stratocumulomutatus clouds where the wind is stronger as height increases.

Genitus mother clouds 
Stratus cumulogenitus clouds occur when the base of cumulus clouds spreads, creating a nebulous sheet of stratiform clouds. This can also occur on nimbostratus clouds (stratus nimbostratogenitus) and on cumulonimbus clouds (stratus cumulonimbogenitus). Stratus fractus clouds can also form under the base of precipitation-bearing clouds and are classified as pannus clouds. Stratus clouds may also form from formation mechanisms that aren't typical for the cloud type, for example, Stratus homogenitus, which are stratus formed by human activity, Stratus caractagenitus, which are formed from the spray of waterfalls, and Stratus silvagenitus, which are formed by evaporation or evapotranspiration occurring in a forest.

Mutatus mother cloud 
Stratus only has one mutatus mother cloud. Stratus stratocumulomutatus clouds occur when stratocumulus opacus patches fuse to create a stratiform layer.

Accessory clouds and supplementary feature 

Stratus clouds don't produce accessory clouds, but a supplementary feature praecipitatio is derived from Latin, which means "precipitation". Stratus clouds are too low to produce virga, or rain shears that evaporate before reaching the ground, although higher stratus clouds can produce it.

Forecast 
A stratus cloud can form from stratocumulus spreading out under an inversion, indicating a continuation of prolonged cloudy weather with drizzle for several hours and then an improvement as it breaks into stratocumulus. Stratus clouds can persist for days in anticyclone conditions. It is common for a stratus to form on a weak warm front, rather than the usual nimbostratus.

Effects on climate 
According to Sednev, Menon, and McFarquhar, Arctic stratus and other low-level clouds form roughly 50% of the annual cloud cover in Arctic regions, causing a large effect on the energy emissions and absorptions through radiation.

Relation to other clouds

Cirrostratus clouds 

Cirrostratus clouds, a very high ice-crystal form of stratiform clouds, can appear as a milky sheen in the sky or as a striated sheet. They are sometimes similar to altostratus and are distinguishable from the latter because the sun or moon is always clearly visible through transparent cirrostratus, in contrast to altostratus which tends to be opaque or translucent. Cirrostratus come in two species, fibratus and nebulosus. The ice crystals in these clouds vary depending upon the height in the cloud. These clouds commonly produce halos, and sometimes the halo is the only indication that such clouds are present. They are formed by warm, moist air being lifted slowly to a very high altitude. When a warm front approaches, cirrostratus clouds become thicker and descend forming altostratus clouds, and rain usually begins 12 to 24 hours later.

Altostratus clouds

Nimbostratus clouds

Stratocumulus clouds 

A stratocumulus cloud is another type of a cumuliform or stratiform cloud. Like stratus clouds, they form at low levels; but like cumulus clouds (and unlike stratus clouds), they form via convection. Unlike cumulus clouds, their growth is almost completely retarded by a strong inversion, causing them to flatten out like stratus clouds and giving them a layered appearance. These clouds are extremely common, covering on average around twenty-three percent of the earth's oceans and twelve percent of the earth's continents. They are less common in tropical areas and commonly form after cold fronts. Additionally, stratocumulus clouds reflect a large amount of the incoming sunlight, producing a net cooling effect. Stratocumulus clouds can produce drizzle, which stabilizes the cloud by warming it and reducing turbulent mixing.

Sources 
 Footnotes

 Bibliography